Jaakko Johannes Friman (January 13, 1904 – February 17, 1987) was a former speed skater from Finland, who represented his native country at the 1928 Winter Olympics in St. Moritz, Switzerland. There, he won the bronze medal in the men's 500 metres. He was born and died in Tampere, Finland.

References
 Jaakko Friman at SkateResults.com

External links
 
 

1904 births
1987 deaths
Finnish male speed skaters
Olympic bronze medalists for Finland
Olympic speed skaters of Finland
Speed skaters at the 1928 Winter Olympics
Place of birth missing
Olympic medalists in speed skating
Medalists at the 1928 Winter Olympics
Sportspeople from Tampere
20th-century Finnish people